Olearia picridifolia, commonly known as rasp scrub-daisy, is a species of flowering plant in the family Asteraceae and is endemic to southern continental Australia. It is a low, spreading shrub with narrowly egg-shaped or narrowly elliptic leaves, and blue, mauve or white and yellow, daisy-like inflorescences.

Description

Taxonomy
This daisy was first formally described in 1853 by Ferdinand von Mueller who gave it the name Eurybia picridifolia in  Linnaea: ein Journal für die Botanik in ihrem ganzen Umfange, oder Beiträge zur Pflanzenkunde, based on plant specimens that he collected in a rocky valley near Arkaba in South Australia. In 1867 George Bentham changed the name to Olearia picridifolia in Flora Australiensis. The specific epithet (picridifolia) means "Picris-leaved".

Distribution and habitat
Rasp scrub-daisy grows in mallee and heath in scattered locations in the south of Western Australia, the south-east of South Australia, and in scattered locations in north-western Victoria.

References

Taxa named by Ferdinand von Mueller
Plants described in 1853
Flora of Western Australia
picridifolia